Ferdinand Ries composed his Violin Sonata in E-flat major, WoO. 7 in 1804, when he was 22 years old. Surviving in manuscript form in the Berlin State Library, there is no evidence the work was performed during the composer's lifetime and was amongst a number of compositions that remained unpublished at the composers death.

Structure

The sonata is structured in five movements, one of which is crossed out in the manuscript:

 Allegro con brio 
 Andantino 
 Allegro molto 
 Adagio molto expressivo
 Allegro molto vivace

References
Notes

Sources
  
 

Violin sonatas by Ferdinand Ries
1804 compositions
Compositions in E-flat major